The Open Identity Exchange (OIX) is a membership organisation that works to accelerate the adoption of digital identity services based on open standards. It is a non-profit organisation and is technology agnostic. It is collaborative, and works across the private and public sectors.

Members work together to jointly fund and participate in pilot projects (sometimes referred to as alpha projects). These pilots test business, legal and/or technical concepts or theory and their interoperability in real world use cases. A white paper is published for every project.

History

Genesis
Shortly after coming into office, the Obama administration asked the U.S. General Services Administration (GSA) how to leverage open identity technologies to allow the American public to more easily, efficiently, and safely interact with federal websites such as the National Institute of Health (NIH), the Social Security Administration (SSA), and the Internal Revenue Service (IRS).

At the 2009 RSA Conference, the GSA sought to build a public/private partnership with the Open ID Foundation (OIDF) and the Information Card Foundation (ICF) in order to craft a workable identity information framework that would establish the legal and policy precedents needed to establish trust for Open ID transactions.

The partnership eventually developed a trust framework model, described below. Further meetings were held at the Internet Identity Workshop in November 2009, which resulted in OIDF and ICF forming a joint steering committee. The committee's task was to study the best implementation options for the newly created framework.

Foundation
The US Chief Information Officer recommended the formation of a non-profit corporation, the Open Identity Exchange (OIX). In January 2010, the OIDF and ICF approved grants to fund the creation of the Open Identity Exchange. OIX was the first trust framework provider certified by the US Government. Booz Allen Hamilton, CA Technologies, Equifax, Google, PayPal, Verisign, and Verizon were all members of either OIDF and ICF, and agreed to become founding members of OIX.

Launch
The Open Identity Exchange was publicly launched at RSA 2010 and it addressed the increasing challenges of building trust in online identity as outlined below:
 Relying Parties must be able to trust that the Identity Provider is providing accurate data
 Identity Providers must be able to trust that the Relying Party is legitimate (i.e. not a hacker, phisher, etc.)
 Direct relying parties to identity provider trust agreements are a common solution, but are impossible to manage at Internet scale

In 2012 the executive director position was founded and National Strategy for Trusted Identities in Cyberspace (NSTIC) pilot projects showed the growing proof of traction and increased awareness and attention. In 2012 OIX UK was formed and throughout 2013 initial UK Cabinet Office Identity Assurance Programme (IDAP) pilots were launched and white papers published.

OIXnet

In 2014, OIX established the OIXnet trust registry, a global authoritative registry of business, legal and technical requirements needed to ensure market adoption and global interoperability.

In 2014, OIDF also announced plans to register all companies self-certifying conformance to OpenID Connect via the OpenID Certification Program on OIXnet.

Purpose
It is an official online and publicly-accessible repository of documents and information relating to identity systems and identity system participants. Referred to as a “registry”, it functions as an official and centralized source of such documents and information, much like a government-operated recorder of deeds.  That is, individuals and entities can register documents and information with the OIXnet registry to provide notice of their contents to the public, and members of the public seeking access to such documents or information can go to that single authoritative location to find them.

The OIXnet registry is designed to provide a single comprehensive and authoritative location where documents and information relating to a specific purpose (in this case, identity systems) can be safely stored for the purpose of putting others on notice of certain facts, and from which such documents and information can be accessed by interested stakeholders seeking such information.

Early participants
OIXnet was launched in 2015. OpenID Foundation was the first registrant by registering the initial set of organizations, including Google, ForgeRock, Microsoft, NRI, PayPal and Ping Identity, certifying conformance to OpenID Connect. Additional registrations were added to OIXnet throughout 2015 and 2016 with 10 trusted identity services currently registered.

Status
The OIXnet registry is currently in pilot in 2016 registering new and diverse trust frameworks and communities of interest.

International chapters
OIX developed a chapters policy in 2015 that allows regional OIX chapters to be established. In 2016 the OIX United Kingdom Chapter was approved by OIX board and launched.

Leadership 
The OIX board represents leaders in online identity in the internet, telecom and data aggregation industries concerned with both market expansion and information security.

Government relations 
The OIX board met with Howard Schmidt in 2011 to discuss the public–private partnership envisioned in the NSTIC strategy.

The UK government's Cabinet Office joined the OIX at board level, as it began the work on its Identity Assurance Programme which is now GOV.UK Verify.

The States of Jersey joined in 2015 so they could leverage the knowledge gained during the development of the UK government identity assurance programme to hasten adaptation and adoption for Jersey.

Membership 
The Open Identity Exchange currently has thirteen executive members and 50+ general members as of November 2016.

Executive Members
Barclays
UK Cabinet Office
CA Technologies
Equifax
Experian
Google
International Airlines Group
LexisNexis
Microsoft
Ping Identity
Symantec
Timpson
Verizon

OIX UK Europe Chapter 
At the beginning of 2015 the Cabinet Office requested Open Identity Exchange to begin a process of exploring the legal, business and pragmatic considerations of creating a self-sustaining UK ‘chapter’ of the Open Identity Exchange. To that point OIX UK operated as an independent UK entity able to administer ‘directed funding’ from member organisations.  It had received a series of grants from the UK Cabinet Office that were used for the collaboratively funded projects.

An ad-hoc board of advisers was formed of independent, experienced, public and private sector leaders who addressed policy considerations during this transition process. In addition to considering the role of OIX UK in the future, this board of advisers considered the private sector's needs for identity services, resulting in an ongoing OIX project.

The Open Identity Exchange board of directors approved an OIX chapters policy at the end of 2015, allowing the formation of individual chapters affiliated with OIX in various local markets. In April 2016 the OIX UK Europe Chapter appointed its board of directors.

White Papers 
The OIX White Papers deliver joint research to examine a wide range of challenges facing the open identity market and to provide possible solutions. They are written by experts in the fields of technology, particularly open identity.

OIX 
OIX: An Open Market Solution for Online Identity Assurance

Trust Frameworks 
Trust Framework Requirements and Guidelines
The Personal Network: A New Trust Model and Business Model for Personal Data
Federated Online Attribute Exchange Initiatives
Personal Levels of Assurance (PLOA)
The Three Pillars of Trust

UK Identity Assurance Programme (IDAP) 
Overview of Legal Liability in the IDAP (In development)

US National Strategy for Trusted Identities in Cyberspace (NSTIC) 
Comments on U.S. NSTIC Steering Group Draft Charter and Related Governance Issues
United States National Strategy for Trusted Identities in Cyberspace Identity Ecosystem Steering Committee Plenary and Governing Board Charter
OIX Response to "Models for a Governance Structure for the National Strategy for Trusted Identity in Cyberspace"

White Papers Published in 2016 
Open Identity Exchange (OIX) White Papers focus on current issues and opportunities in emerging identity markets. OIX white papers are intended to deliver value to the identity ecosystem and take one of two perspectives: a retrospective report on the outcome of a given project or pilot or a prospective discussion on a current issue or opportunity. OIX White Papers are authored by independent domain experts and are intended as summaries for a general business audience.

Recent published whitepapers include:

• Use of online activity as part of the identity verification 

• UK private sector needs for identity assurance 

• Use of digital identity in peer-to-peer economy

• Shared signals proof of concept

• Creating a digital identity in Jersey

• Just Giving and GOV.UK Verify

• Creating a pensions dashboard 

• Could digital identities help transform consumers attitudes and behavior towards savings?

• Digital identity across borders: opening a bank account in another EU country

• Generating Revenue and Subscriber Benefits: An Analysis of: The ARPU of Identity

Projects 
OIX projects deliver joint research to examine a wide range of challenges facing the open identity market and to provide possible solutions.

States of Jersey: Creating a Digital ID 

The hypothesis was that the UK Government identity assurance model could be adapted for Jersey with the support of certified UK IdPs and potential identity assurance hub providers, to meet the requirements of SoJ. The hypothesis also considered that this would create an attractive market opportunity in Jersey for one or more of these providers.

LIGHTest Project 
This is a 3-year project that started in September 2016 and is partially funded from the European Union Horizon 2020 research and innovation programme under G.A, No. 700321. The LIGHTest consortium consists of 14 partners from 9 European countries and coordinated by Fraunhofer-Gesellschaft. The project looks to reach out beyond Europe, to build a global community.

LIGHTest (Lightweight Infrastructure for Global Heterogeneous Trust management in support of an open Ecosystem of Stakeholders and Trust schemes)

The objective of LIGHTest is to create a global cross-domain trust infrastructure that renders it transparent and easy for verifiers to evaluate electronic transactions. By querying different trust authorities worldwide and combining trust aspects related to identity, business, reputation etc. it will become possible to conduct domain-specific trust decisions.

This is achieved by reusing existing governance, organization, infrastructure, standards, software, community, and know-how of the existing Domain Name System, combined with new innovative building blocks. This approach allows an efficient global rollout of a solution that assists decision makers in their trust decisions. By integrating mobile identities into the scheme, LIGHTest also enables domain-specific assessments on Levels of Assurance for these identities.

GOV.UK Verify

The UK Government, Cabinet Office joined the OIX at board level, as it began the work on its Identity Assurance Programme (IDAP).  Through the OIX Directed Funding programme, a considerable number of projects continue to be carried out under OIX governance, the results of which have helped with the ongoing development of GOV.UK Verify.  Work continues as GDS looks at how digital identities can be used in both the public and private sector.

GOV.UK Verify is built and maintained by the Government Digital Service (GDS), part of the Cabinet Office. The UK Government is committed to expanding GOV.UK Verify and helping to grow a market for identity assurance that will be able to meet user needs in relation to central government services, as well as for local, health and private sector services.  GOV.UK Verify uses certified companies to verify your identity to government. A certified company is a private company that works to high industry and government standards when they verify your identity.

References

External links 
 
 OIXnet

Cloud standards
Password authentication
Federated identity
Identity management initiative
Computational trust
Information technology organisations based in the United Kingdom
Organisations based in the City of Westminster